Garh Maharaja, 
is a Town Committee of Ahmedpur Sial Tehsil in the Jhang District in the Punjab province of Pakistan. It is located at 30°50'0" North, 71°54'0" East.
The Shrine of Sultan Bahu is located in Garh Maharaja. It is a popular and frequently-visited Sufi shrine. Garh Maharaja located 17 km from Shorkot, 38 km Kot Bahadur Shah,  and 65 km from Chowk Azam.

References 

Jhang District
Populated places in Jhang District